HHL Leipzig Graduate School of Management, formerly known as Handelshochschule Leipzig, is a private business school based in Saxony, Germany. Established in 1898, it is one of the world's oldest business schools. The school is accredited internationally by AACSB and locally by ACQUIN. HHL Leipzig graduate school of management is authorized to award doctoral and postdoctoral degrees.

History

The school was founded in 1898 upon an initiative by the Leipzig Chamber of Commerce. In 1946, it was integrated into Leipzig University and regained partial independence in 1969. After the Fall of the Iron Curtain and the reunification of Germany, the school was re-founded under private management in 1992, again, through an initiative of the Leipzig Chamber of Commerce.

Ranking
 #2 in Germany and #23 Worldwide for Master of Science in Management Program [Financial Times Ranking 2020] 
 #5 in Germany in the Financial Times ranking of European Business Schools.
 #20 worldwide and #7 in category Career Service worldwide in Global Masters in Management Ranking 2017 by Financial Times 
 #7 for Career service worldwide in Financial Times Global Masters in Management Ranking 2017 
 #2 for Salary Increase post MBA in Germany and #15 for Career Progress worldwide in Financial Times Executive MBA Ranking 2016 
 #40 in Europe and among the top 5 business schools in Germany in European Business School Rankings 2015 by Financial Times
 among the top MBA programs in the world among top 3 business schools in Germany in MBA Rankings 2015 by América Economía
 ranked #6 in the international ranking “Masters in Management” worldwide of The Economist in 2017
 listed in the international ranking “Executive MBA” of The Economist in 2015
 ranked as most popular private business school in Germany by trendence Graduate Barometer "Business Edition" 2017
 ranked as best institution in entrepreneurship in Germany among small universities and institutions of higher education by Stifterverband für die Deutsche Wissenschaft Gründungsradar 2016 Ranking

HHL Leipzig Graduate School of Management was declared one of the best masters in management programs in Germany by the Financial Times.

Study Programs

Master in Business Administration 
 15-21-month full-time program 
 24-month part-time program

Master in Management, M.Sc. 
  18-month full-time program
  24-month part-time program

Global Executive MBA
 jointly run by HHL Leipzig and EADA Business School 
 21-month program with 2 or 3 residential weeks at business schools in Germany, Spain, Brazil, China and India

Euro*MBA (Distance Learning)
 24-month program with six residential weeks
 ranked Top 4 by The Economist rating WhichMBA? Guide February 2010

Doctoral Program
The doctoral program is for candidates who hold a secondary university degree. Within three years, the candidate participates in lectures, courses, a research colloquium and conferences. After successfully completing all requirements and acceptance of the doctoral thesis, the candidate is awarded the degree Dr. rer.oec.

Partner Universities
The school maintains a network of more than 120 partner universities worldwide.
 Imperial College Business School, Imperial College London
 Booth School of Business, University of Chicago
 Tuck School of Business, Dartmouth College
 Goizueta Business School, Emory University 
 Baruch College, City University of New York 
 Freeman School of Business, Tulane University
 EADA Business School 
 Nanyang Business School, Nanyang Technological University
 Indian Institute of Management Udaipur
 Norwegian School of Management
 Guanghua School of Management, Beijing University
 Lingnan (University) College, Sun Yat-sen University
 Indian Institute of Management
 Asian Institute of Technology, Thailand
 Shanghai Jiao Tong University, China
 National Chengchi University, Taiwan
 NUCB Business School, Japan

Honorary doctors, senators and professors 
 Heribert Meffert
 Michael Spence
 Wendelin Wiedeking
 Michael E. Porter
 Philip Kotler
 Kurt Biedenkopf
 Bernhard Walter
 Burkhard Schwenker
 Hans Werner Sinn
 Gerhard Casper
 Jürgen F. Strube
 Stefan H. Thomke
 Arend Oetker
 Horst Albach
 Ludwig Trippen (†)
 Joseph A. Maciarello
 Angela Merkel

Professors and alumni 
 Karl von der Aa
 Abraham Adler
 Hermann Großmann
 Timo Meynhardt
 Balduin Penndorf
 Eugen Schmalenbach 
 Rudolf Seyffert
 Franz Koch
 Arnis Vilks

Literature
100 Jahre Handelshochschule Leipzig 1898–1998. Festschrift anlässlich des 100-jährigen Gründungsjubiläums der Handelshochschule Leipzig am 25. April 1998; Published by: Handelshochschule Leipzig.

References

External links

Official website
Interview with HHL MBA Recruiting Officer
Blog about the activities at HHL

Business schools in Germany
Education in Leipzig
Educational institutions established in 1898
1898 establishments in Germany